Walstead is a hamlet located  south east of Lindfield, West Sussex, England. The hamlet is the home of Great Walstead School, Paxhill Park Golf Course and a nursing home at Walstead Place, a country house built in 1852.